Lauro Gazzolo (born Ilario Gazzolo; 15 October 1900 – 2 October 1970) was an Italian actor and voice actor.

Biography
Born in Nervi in Genoa, Gazzolo began his career on screen in 1938 starring in the comedy film The Document and became more successful after the end of World War II. A popular character actor, he appeared in at least 106 films and played many roles between 1939 and 1966. Among his most popular filmography included The Jester's Supper, Four Steps in the Clouds and The Band of Honest Men. In his later films, he appeared alongside his son Nando Gazzolo in the 1961 film Constantine and the Cross. This would mark Nando's film debut.

As a voice actor, Gazzolo dubbed foreign films into the Italian language. He was the official Italian voice actor of Walter Brennan and Bud Abbott. He even dubbed over the voices of Sam Jaffe, George Hayes, Peter Lorre, Alan Napier, Joseph Egger, Arthur Malet, H. B. Warner, Gary Cooper, Charlie Chaplin, Charley Grapewin and Fernandel in either most of or their iconic film appearances. He was best known for dubbing elderly characters in western films and he was partnered up with his colleague Carlo Romano (Lou Costello's official dubber) in the Abbott and Costello sketches. In his animated roles, Gazzolo was renowned for dubbing characters in Walt Disney films such as Bashful in Snow White and the Seven Dwarfs, Dandy (Jim) Crow in Dumbo, The White Rabbit in Alice in Wonderland, Archimedes in The Sword in the Stone and Jock in Lady and the Tramp.

Selected filmography

 

 Duetto vagabondo (1939)
 At Your Orders, Madame (1939) - Il cameriere all'albergo
 I, His Father (1939) - Sardella
 La grande luce - Montevergine (1939) - Bartolomeo
 Two Million for a Smile (1939) - L'ufficiale giudiziario
 Defendant, Stand Up! (1939) - L'uomo dagli schiaffi
 Unjustified Absence (1939) - Il preside
 The Document (1939) - Uno dei lestofani
 Cose dell'altro mondo (1939) - Sam Raymond, un detenuto
 Scandalo per bene (1940) - Il procuratore Contarini, suo padre
 Il segreto di Villa Paradiso (1940) - Joe
 Red Tavern (1940) - Il marchese Domenico Torresi, suo zio
 One Hundred Thousand Dollars (1940) - Stefano Zilay
 Mare (1940) - Perasso
 Incanto di mezzanotte (1940) - Martino
 Beyond Love (1940) - Il conte Sabelli-Catanzaro, ministro di polizia
 Big Shoes (1940) - Giancola
 Inspector Vargas (1940) - Dedè, il landrucolo
 La leggenda azzurra (1940)
 Eternal Melodies (1940) - Il locandiere Deiner
 Caravaggio (1941) - Zio Nello
 L'attore scomparso (1941) - L'impresario
 Con le donne non si scherza (1941) - Il professor Ferri
 Pia de' Tolomei (1941) - Fra' Martino
 The Betrothed (1941) - Ambrogio Fusella
 The Jester's Supper (1942) - Il Trinca
 Headlights in the Fog (1942) - Egisto
 Giungla (1942) - Will Rubber, il giornalista
 La pantera nera (1942) - L'ispettore Stefano Hegeduz
 Soltanto un bacio (1942) - Il professore Giorgi
 The Taming of the Shrew (1942) - Battista, padre di Catina
 The Gorgon (1942) - Il fedele servo di Spina
 Four Steps in the Clouds (1942) - Il controllore sul treno
 Notte di fiamme (1942)
 Sucedió en Damasco (1943) - Cadi Al-Mon
 Redemption (1943) - Tonio
 Incontri di notte (1943) - Il professore Lauro Renzi
 Short Circuit (1943) - L'editore Isidoro Storch
 A Living Statue (1943) - Raffaele
 Enrico IV (1943) - Giovanni
 Grazia (1943)
 The Last Wagon (1943) - Andrea, il portiere
 In cerca di felicità (1944) - Peppino
 Vietato ai minorenni (1944) - Il professore di storia naturale
 La resa di Titì (1945)
 Lettere al sottotenente (1945)
 The Innocent Casimiro (1945) - Pietro
 Down with Misery (1945) - Il commandattore Trombetti
 The Models of Margutta (1946) - Federico
 The Ways of Sin (1946) - Il farmacista
 Peddlin' in Society (1946) - Il commandatore Bardacò
 Trepidazione (1946)
 Il mondo vuole così (1946) - Carla's father
 Biraghin (1946)
 Shamed (1947) - Valentino
 Man with the Grey Glove (1948) - Critico d'arte
 La Rosa di Bagdad (1949) - The Grand Kadi (voice)
 Il cielo è rosso (1950) - Shoemaker
 Ring Around the Clock (1950) - Guerrieri
 Alina (1950) - Paolo
 Father's Dilemma (1950) - Cliente che compro l'uovo pasquale
 Tomorrow Is Too Late (1950) - Signor Giusti
 Strano appuntamento (1950)
 Sambo (1950) - Conte Orsetto Orseolo
 Canzone di primavera (1951) - Parodi
 Fiamme sulla laguna (1952) - Antonio
 Ha da venì... don Calogero (1952) - Evaristo, il farmacista
 Beauties in Capri (1952) - Don Camillo
 The Woman Who Invented Love (1952) - Marchese Doria
 Il romanzo della mia vita (1952) - Cavalier Marchetti
 La figlia del diavolo (1952) - Il farmacista
 Poppy (1952) - Il preside
 La colpa di una madre (1952) - Il pescatore
 Il tallone di Achille (1952) - Ing, Felix
 Riscatto (1953) - L'oste
 Sul ponte dei sospiri (1953) - Il banchiere
 Too Young for Love (1953) - Vicepresidente del tribunale
 Martin Toccaferro (1953) - Commendatore
 Past Lovers (1953)
 Of Life and Love (1954) - The administrator (segment "Marsina Stretta")
 Mid-Century Loves (1954) - The Teacher (segment "Guerra 1915-18")
 The Three Thieves (1954) - The Prosecutor
 Pellegrini d'amore (1954) - Capitano peschereccio
 House of Ricordi (1954) - Carlotti
 Casta Diva (1954) - Signor Monti
 Accadde tra le sbarre (1955) - Leonida Dei - the jeweller refugee
 La ladra (1955) - Il Maggiordomo
 Io sono la Primula Rossa (1955) - Chiffon
 Dramma nel porto (1955)
 Incatenata dal destino (1956)
 The Band of Honest Men (1956) - Andrea
 Mai ti scorderò (1956) - Don Vincenzo
 I miliardari (1956) - Il medico
 Due sosia in allegria (1956)
 Londra chiama Polo Nord (1956) - Colonel Richardson
 Noi siamo le colonne (1956) - Signor Bonci
 Saranno uomini (1957)
 Goha (1958) - Taj-el-Ouloum
 Adorabili e bugiarde (1958) - President of the Court
 Il bacio del sole (Don Vesuvio) (1958) - Il vescovo
 Le confident de ces dames (1959) - Le président
 Avventura in città (1959)
 Constantine and the Cross (1961) - Amodius (uncredited)
 Blood Feud (1961) - Burlando
 Un figlio d'oggi (1961) - Orafo
 Un marito in condominio (1963) - Enea
 La volpe e le camelie (1966)
 On My Way to the Crusades, I Met a Girl Who... (1967) - Eremita
 The Adventures of Pinocchio (1971) - The Talking Cricket (voice)

References

External links

 
 
 

1900 births
1970 deaths
Actors from Genoa
Italian male film actors
Italian male voice actors
Italian male stage actors
Italian male television actors
Italian male radio actors
20th-century Italian male actors